Airblade may refer to:

AirBlade, a PlayStation 2 game
Dyson Airblade, a hand dryer